Benjamin Becker was the defending champion, but he chose not to compete this year.Denis Gremelmayr won in the final 6–4, 7–5 against Marius Copil.

Seeds

Draw

Finals

Top half

Bottom half

References
Main Draw
Qualifying Singles

Trofeo Paolo Corazzi - Singles
Trofeo Paolo Corazzi